Eikemo is a surname. Notable people with the surname include:

 Jon Eikemo (born 1939), Norwegian actor
 Olve Eikemo (born 1973), Norwegian musician

Norwegian-language surnames